The Fermanagh county football team represents Fermanagh GAA, the county board of the Gaelic Athletic Association, in the Gaelic sport of football. The team competes in the three major annual inter-county competitions; the All-Ireland Senior Football Championship, the Ulster Senior Football Championship and the National Football League.

Fermanagh's home ground is Brewster Park, Enniskillen. The team's manager is Kieran Donnelly.

The team has never won the Ulster Senior Championship, the All-Ireland Senior Championship or the National League, the only county besides Wicklow never to have won its provincial championship.

History
Fermanagh is the only team in the province of Ulster to have never won the Ulster Senior Football Championship (SFC).

Fragments of a poem from 1806 describe a football match between Louth and Fermanagh at Inniskeen in County Monaghan.

20th century
Fermanagh defeated Cavan in the 1914 Ulster SFC semi-final and the Ulster Council nominated the county to play Wexford in the All-Ireland Senior Football Championship (SFC) semi-final. Because the train schedules did not allow them to get back for Sunday night, and the Great Northern Railway Company refused to run a special train because they were opposed to sport on Sunday, Fermanagh had to abdicate the responsibility to Monaghan (the Monaghan team later defeated Fermanagh in the Ulster SFC final anyway).

One of Ulster's great footballers, Armagh-born Jim McCullough, played for Fermanagh in the mid-1930s and helped them reach the 1935 Ulster SFC final and 1936 National League final.

Peter McGinnity was the outstanding player of the under-21 team which reached two All-Ireland finals and defeated Derry and Tyrone to reach the 1982 Ulster SFC final, Despite a Peter McGinnity goal that put Fermanagh into the lead with 20 minutes remaining, the county lost 0–10 to 1–4 to Armagh.

Under manager Pat King, the county achieved a hat-trick of successes in 1997 in the B Championship, Dr McKenna Cup and Division 4 of the National League.

21st century
Fermanagh was a beneficiary of the change to the GAA championship in the 2000s.

In 2003, the county defeated Donegal in the Ulster SFC, then Cavan, Meath and Mayo in All-Ireland SFC qualifiers to reach a first All-Ireland SFC quarter-final.

Charlie Mulgrew was appointed manager in January 2004.

The county went to a replayed All-Ireland SFC semi-final in 2004, defeating (in the All-Ireland SFC qualifiers) Meath, Cork and getting past Donegal with a one-point win after extra-time, Then, most memorably of all, Armagh in the All-Ireland SFC quarter-final, thanks to a late point by Tom Brewster. A loss to Mayo in the semi-final replay ended the county's season. In 2006, despite running All-Ireland SFC favourites Armagh close twice in the Ulster SFC, Fermanagh yet again ended the season without a trophy after losing to Donegal in the fourth round of the All-Ireland SFC qualifiers. 2007 brought the loss of the county's National League Division 1 status, having failed to register a single point from its seven match campaign. Fermanagh performed better in the Ulster SFC however, only losing by an injury-time point to Tyrone. The county then defeated Wexford (for the second consecutive season) in the first round of the All-Ireland SFC qualifiers. However, it was unable to record a third win in four seasons over Meath at Navan in July, losing narrowly by two points despite dominating the latter stages. Charlie Mulgrew, manager for four seasons, stood down after this match, to be succeeded by Malachy O'Rourke. O'Rourke's first season featured a first appearance in an Ulster SFC final for 26 years, lost eventually to Armagh in a replay. His time as manager ended in 2010, after Fermanagh were relegated to Division 4 of the National Football League and a heavy defeat to Monaghan in the 2010 Ulster SFC semi-final.

Peter Canavan served as manager for two years, achieving promotion to Division 3 and a win against Westmeath in the All-Ireland SFC qualifiers. Canavan departed in 2013, with the county board acknowledging that he had taken the helm "at a very difficult time" and his management team stating that "significant progress has been made. The senior footballers now representing their county are fully committed, unified and ambitious".

In an unexpected development, Pete McGrath was appointed as Canavan's successor in November 2013, seeing off the challenge of former player Peter McGinnity, Gerry Moane and Kevin McStay. He brought the team to the 2015 All-Ireland SFC quarter-final before the players forced him out in 2017, shortly after he had said he would like to continue for another season. The player heave against McGrath drew criticism from observers outside the county.

Ryan McMenamin's time in charge was affected by the impact of the COVID-19 pandemic on Gaelic games. He departed as manager in August 2021. Former player Kieran Donnelly replaced him.

Support
A supporters' club, called Club Eirne, exists.

Current panel

Management team
Manager: Kieran Donnelly
Selector: Ger Treacy
Forward coach: Ronan O'Neill (Omagh St Enda's), from the 2023 season
Other: Ferghal Quinn, Pat Cadden, Leon Carters, Stephen Carters, Niall Smyth, Stephen Jackson

Managerial history
Fermanagh appointed an outside manager, Charlie Mulgrew from Donegal, to lead the team to the 2004 All-Ireland SFC semi-finals (a first in the team's history).

Players

Notable players
Below is The Irish News 125 Fermanagh Player List:

Records
Rory Gallagher, with 3–9 against Monaghan in 2002, matched the 5–3 record set by Johnny Joyce of Dublin in 1960 for the highest individual scorer in any championship football match. Cillian O'Connor's four goals (accompanied by nine points) in the 2020 All-Ireland Senior Football Championship semi-final at Croke Park broke that record after eighteen years.
In 2015, Cillian O'Connor was in the running for the Golden Boot and initially finished tied for top with Fermanagh's Seán Quigley. However, following a review of Mayo's championship winning DVD, the Gaelic Athletic Association realised they had incorrectly noted O'Connor's score as they had recorded him as having scored 1-6 but he had actually scored 1–7. As a result, O'Connor's tally was increased by 1 which allowed him to claim the Golden Boot.

Most appearances
Between 2008 and 2021: 
 1 Ryan Jones (Donnelly's midfield partner, 117 appearances, including 106 starts)
 2 Eoin Donnelly, Coa (midfielder, 114 appearances)
 3 Barry Mulrone, Devenish (110 appearances)
 4 Declan McCusker, Ederney (110 appearances)
 5 Seán Quigley, Roslea (forward, 101 appearances)
 6 Aidan Breen, Tempo (92 appearances)
 7 Mickey Jones, Derrygonnelly (defender, 89 appearances)
 8 Tomás Corrigan (corner-forward, 85 appearances)
 9 Paul McCusker, Ederney (86 appearances)
 10 Ryan McCluskey (80 appearances)

All Stars
Fermanagh has 4 All Stars, as of 2006. 3 different players have won, as of 2006. No player has won more than two All Stars.

 1982: Peter McGinnity
 2004: Barry Owens, Martin McGrath
 2006: Barry Owens2nd

Honours
Official honours, with additions noted.

National
All-Ireland Senior Football Championship
 Semi-finalists (1): 2004
All-Ireland Junior Football Championship
 Winners (1): 1959
All-Ireland Under-21 Football Championship
 Runners-up (2): 1970, 1971 
All-Ireland Vocational Schools Championship
 Winners (2):  1966, 1996 St Comhghalls Lisnaskea

Provincial
Ulster Senior Football Championship
 Runners-up (6): 1914, 1935, 1945, 1982, 2008, 2018
Dr McKenna Cup
 Winners (4): 1930, 1933, 1977, 1997
Ulster Junior Football Championship
 Winners (2): 1943, 1959
 Runners-up (3): 1942, 1949, 1971
Ulster Under-21 Football Championship
 Winners (3): 1970, 1971, 1994
 Runners-up (2): 1997, 2001
Ulster Minor Football Championship
 Runners-up (4): 1967, 1970, 1971, 2003

References

 
County football teams